The Lavra fortification is a system of walls, towers and other constructions built for the protection of the Cave Monastery in Kyiv, the capital of Ukraine.

History

The fortification around the monastery first arouse at the end of the 12th century, when a 2 metre wide leave, 5 metre high stone wall was erected. This wall was destroyed during the Mongol invasion of Rus and was finally excavated by archeologists in 1951. After the Mongol invasion, the monastery was defended by wooden walls. In 1679, Hetman Ivan Samoylovych had a moat and new ramparts added to the fortification around the "upper monastery." 

Hetman Ivan Mazepa financed the fortification's construction at the height of the Great Northern War, and had a thick stone wall with four towers added for protection of the monastery in case of Swedish attack. The fort had three gates, Holy gates with the Trinity Gate Church, Economy gates with the All Saints Church, and Southern gates or Caves gates. There were also four towers, Ivan Kushchnyk Tower, Onufriy Tower, Painter Tower, and Clock Tower.

In 1706, Tsar Peter I ordered the construction of the so-called "Old Cave Fortress." The earliest plans for the fortress were done by engineer named Gellert. It was completed in 1723, and consisted of a semicircular citadel with a 6 metre high earthen rampart, eight bulwarks, and other fortifications. The new fortress had an arsenal of 467 artillery guns, 27 mortars, and 3 howitzers.

During the 18th and 19th centuries, the fortress was rebuilt again, particularly around the near and far caves. The new project was created by Otto von Freiman and carried out by Lieutenant Colonel Burman. During that time, the Old Cave Fortress constructed in the 18th century was the base for the administrative and military institutions of the Russian Empire in the city.

Constructions

The fortification consisted of a total of four towers: 
 the Southwest Tower, also called the tower of Ivan Kushchnik, taken from the name of the church that was supposed to be constructed in the tower but was not built; 
 the South Tower, or the Horologium, also called the Clock Tower, because it had an installed clock up to 1818; 
 the North Tower, also called the Painting Tower, because it once held a painting studio; 
 and the East Tower containing the church of Saint Onufry, also called the Chamber Tower because at one time it contained Hetman Mazepa's chambers.

Near the North Tower, there is a water tower, which is not part of the Lavra fortification system. It was designed by the architect V. Sychugov and constructed to ensure the Lavra's fresh water supply in 1879.

References
 
 Kyivan Cave Fortress at the Encyclopedia of Ukraine 

Kyiv Pechersk Lavra
Walls
Fortifications in Ukraine
Buildings and structures in Kyiv
Pecherskyi District
Buildings and structures completed in the 12th century
Buildings and structures completed in 1723